Lega may refer to:

Geography
 Lega (river) in Poland 
 Lega, Iran, a village in Mazandaran Province
 Lega, Warmian-Masurian Voivodeship, town in north Poland
 Lega, an earlier name for Street, Somerset, a village in England

People
 Lega (surname), mainly Italian family name
 Lega people, an ethnic group in the Congo 
 Lega language, the language of the Lega people

Political organizations
 Lega (political party), Italian party established in 2017
 Lega Nord, Italian political party established in 1989, a predecessor of Lega
 Lega dei Ticinesi, political party in Ticino, Switzerland
 La Lega (cooperative) or La Lega Nazionale, an Italian co-operative association founded in the 19th century on irredentist ideals

Sports
Lega Calcio, former governing body of Serie A and Serie B
Lega Serie A, organizer of Serie A
Lega Serie B, organizer of Serie B
Lega Pallavolo Serie A, one of two organizers of the Superlega

Other
 "La Lega" (song), Italian workers' song
 La lega, an 1876 opera by Giovanni Josse

See also
 Legea, an Italian sportswear company
 Liga (disambiguation)

Language and nationality disambiguation pages